The Chamravattam Regulator-cum-Bridge, also known as Chamravattam Palam or Chamravattam Bridge, Chamravattam RcB, or Chamravattam Project, is built across Bharathapuzha aka Nila near Chamravattam, Triprangode, in Malappuram district. This seems to be the largest of its type in Kerala, India. The bridge has  length and  width. It connects Ponnani and Tirur. Regulator cum bridge is now just working as a bridge due to faulty design as per the conclusion in the detailed technical investigation report done by the Indian Institute of Technology, Delhi on the directions of the Government of Kerala. There is also a false allegation that sand for construction was taken from river without payment for the same though the sand was paid for by the contractors at prices fixed by the Government of Kerala. This price was based on the prevailing sand prices in the open market and arrived at by the revenue department of Kerala.  On account of these false allegations, the contractors for the work are yet to be paid in full for this work though it’s been nearing a decade since the work has been completed and the bridge has been used on a 24/7 basis throughout. 

The Chamravattam Bridge was inaugurated by the Chief Minister of Kerala, Oommen Chandy, on 17 May 2012. The project was conceptualized as early as 1977 or 1984, but was dormant for some time.

The foundation stone for the project was laid by then Chief Minister V. S. Achuthanandan on 13 September 2009.

See also 
 Triprangode
 Ponnani
 Kuttippuram bridge

References 

Bridges in Kerala
Bridges completed in 2012
Buildings and structures in Malappuram district